Saxo Bank is a Danish investment bank specializing in online trading and investment. It was founded as a brokerage firm in 1992, under the name Midas Fondsmæglerselskab (English: Midas Stockbroker Company), by Lars Seier Christensen, Kim Fournais, and Marc Hauschildt. The name was changed to Saxo when the company obtained a banking license in 2001. Saxo offers trading through its online platforms in Forex, stocks, CFDs, futures, funds, bonds, and futures spreads. The company functions as an online broker with a bank license, without offering traditional banking products. According to Saxo, roughly half of its activities are derived from partnerships with institutional trading partners. More than 100 financial institutions globally service their end clients with Saxo Bank's platforms on a white-label basis

Saxo Bank is headquartered in Copenhagen, but also has offices in financial centres such as London, Paris, Zurich, Dubai, Singapore, India, and Tokyo. According to the bank, it has clients in 180 countries, and has a daily average turnover of approximately US$12 billion.

Saxo Bank is known for its success in online trading and investment and has received a number of awards. Domestically the bank is also known for its two founders who are often outspoken on Danish politics. Revenue reached DKK 3,006 million in 2014 delivering a net income of DKK 381.2 million. It has a staff of 1600.

Saxo Bank has launched several white-label partnerships with banks such as Standard Bank, Old Mutual Wealth, Banco Carregosa and Banco Best.

Ownership
Saxo Bank is privately held with Geely Financials Denmark A/S – a subsidiary of Chinese automotive company Zhejiang Geely Holding Group Co., Ltd – owning a 50.89% stake. Founder and CEO, Kim Fournais, owns 27.53%, while Sampo Group owns 19.43% of the company. Minority shareholders, including current and former employees, hold the remaining shares.

Business model
Saxo Bank describes itself as a facilitator in financial markets. For trading in listed equities, liquidity is provided through connectivity to the world's major stock exchanges. For online margin trading in non-listed products, the bank obtains liquidity from more than 15 large banks. Through its trading platforms, both retail and institutional clients have access to a range of financial instruments: Forex, stocks, CFDs, futures, funds, bonds, and futures spreads.

Saxo Bank services both retail clients and institutional clients such as banks, brokers, fund managers, money managers, family offices, and private banks.

History

1990s: Midas Fondsmæglerselskab
Lars Seier Christensen and Kim Fournais formed Midas Fondsmæglerselskab after meeting in London in the early 1990s. Christensen was working as a broker for Gerald Metals at the time while Fournais worked at the now defunct Lannung Bank. The two said that they both felt like they had found their business soul mate.

When the company acquired its license, the periodical Økonomisk Ugebrev, Economic Weekly began publishing an article series on sidegadevekslererne, the bucket shops of Denmark, and included Midas. During the autumn of 1996 well-known Danish business man Karsten Ree claimed he had been cheated by Midas into making fictive investments via their wealth management services, suffering losses in excess of DKK 800,000 in one month.

The company subsequently underwent a criminal investigation by the Director of Public Prosecutions but was cleared of all charges.

2000s: Name change and banking license

In 1997, Midas launched its first internet product; a trading platform for currencies called MITS (later replaced by SaxoTrader). The company renamed to Saxo Bank, named after the Danish Saxo Grammaticus, because there was already a Nigerian bank called Mida operating at an international level. Saxo obtained its new banking license in 2001, began expanding its online presence and moved to new headquarters in the Copenhagen suburb of Gentofte.

Global expansion and acquisitions
Saxo Bank launched its products and services in Europe during the early 2000s. In 2001, its first white-label product was launched with a Portuguese securities dealer. In September 2004, it also launched its first US white-label product. Following the launch of Citigroup's CitiFX Pro, an online foreign exchange trading platform developed by Saxo, in November 2008, the Bank would focus entirely on its institutional clients in the US.

In September 2007, Saxo announced the acquisition of its Swiss white-label client, Synthesis Bank. In late May, Saxo bought a French brokerage, Cambiste, that was later renamed Saxo Banque France. During 2009, Saxo opened offices in Milan, Prague and Dubai. By year-end, Saxo Bank had around 13–14 foreign sales offices, up from eight the year before.

Saxo has since been growing through add-on acquisitions and startups, and has built an asset management department, Saxo Asset Management, legally segregated from the rest of the Bank, through acquisitions. In 2009, Saxo acquired Sirius Kapitalforvaltning and in June 2009, it purchased the full share capital of Capital Four Management Fondsmaeglerselskab A/S and 51% of the share capital of Global Evolution Fondsmaeglerselskab A/S, providing expertise for Danish bond & equity instruments.

In 2015, Saxo Bank invested in financial technology firm, Saxo Payments The business was sold by Saxo Bank in July 2018 to investment firm EQT (through EQT VIII and EQT Ventures) for $300M after Saxo Payments relaunched as Banking Circle.

2010 growth
In March 2010, Saxo Bank launched a new equity platform able to trade in over 11,000 stocks and other products listed on 23 major exchanges worldwide.

Saxo Bank was later named the Best White Label Solution Provider in the world, at the World Finance Foreign Exchange Awards 2010, citing "the Bank's long established program of investment and innovation within its White Label business". In the same month the bank was also awarded Best re-labelling platform for 2010 by industry magazine Profit & Loss. Saxo was voted into the top spot by subscribers to represent 'reader's choice'.

In July 2010, CEO Kim Fournais stated that the bank's 2009 turnover of DKK 70 billion on a daily basis had been broken, despite negative press at the start of the year. The growth is believed partly to spring from an explosive growth in Saxo Bank's largest partner, Citi, whose turnover resulting from trading grew nearly 500% in the first 6 months of 2010. In August 2010, the Bank's half-year results revealed that net profit had indeed increased 13-fold from DKK 41 million to DKK 551 million, making the first six months of 2010 better, than any other full year in Saxo Bank's history.

In its 2010 results, Saxo Bank proved to have grown way beyond industry averages with profits trebling compared to 2009. It also revealed that it had launched another online platform this time with Barclays Stockbrokers to supply their UK client base with an International Equities platform. Named 'International Trader', it encompasses over 9,000 equities, 21 major global exchanges in 13 international markets and Securities research. The release were already being marketed widely in the UK marketplace as well as to Barclays' existing UK clients base. In May 2011, Saxo Bank furthermore announced it would provide TD Waterhouse, the UK's leading execution only broker, with an online derivatives trading platform for retail investors.

Transparency initiatives
According to Markit, Saxo Bank was the first financial institution to report its CFDs on Single Stock trades on a voluntary basis, in a bid to bring greater transparency to this fast growing market.

Australia
In 2012, Saxo Bank was reprimanded by the Australian Securities & Investments Commission (ASIC) over its risk management practices, two days after announcing intention to develop retail online trading in Australia. The regulator imposed extra licensing conditions, including a requirement to hire an expert to check on its subsidiary Saxo Capital Markets Australia's systems to address credit risk, client risk and compliance risk.

The ASIC Chairman, Greg Medcraft, said the additional licence conditions on Saxo Bank's AFSL reflected ASIC's priority to improve industry standards amongst financial services licensees. He added that the new licence conditions were an important part of restoring investor confidence in the broader broking area and providing reassurance that compliance procedures are in place to ensure risk management practices are of the standard required under the law. This came after Russell Johnson, Director of Sonray Capital Markets, which acted as a white-label to Saxo Bank, was sentenced to six and a half years in jail after the firm owed A$76 million.

Stock broker BBY appointed liquidators in June 2015 due to insufficient funds to meet its obligations. BBY operated as a white-label to Saxo Bank offering Foreign Exchange contracts and other financial products. Court proceedings deemed that BBY illegally pooled a disproportionate level of funds with Saxo Bank which should have been allocated to clients holding Equities and Exchange Traded contracts.

Saxo Privatbank
On 17 September 2010, Saxo Bank announced plans to invest DKK 59 million in Brorup Sparekasse; a small Danish savings bank founded in 1897 with seven branches, which was renamed to Saxo Privatbank offering core banking services in Denmark. The bank also said that it intended to offer at least DKK 150 million more in capital contribution when the terms for transforming the Brorup Sparekasse into a joint-stock company were fulfilled. Brorup Sparekasse ran into difficulties in 2008 and 2009, primarily due to failed speculation in unlisted bonds, which led to 2009 negative revenue of DKK 74 million before tax. Saxo Bank later announced that the terms for transforming Brorup Sparekasse into a joint-stock company were fulfilled with Saxo Bank as the largest shareholder owning 98,6%

Saxo Privatbank had branches in the Danish cities Brørup, Esbjerg, Fredericia, Hellerup, Kolding, Odense, Vejle and Århus. In April 2018, Alm. Brand Bank bought Saxo Privatbank for DKK 360 million.

TradingFloor.com and social trading
In January 2014, Saxo Bank launched a beta version of a transformed TradingFloor.com, a community portal re-launched into the first multi-asset social trading platform. The site encourages users to share information, tips and strategies publicly. The bank's founders said they want the site to make financial trading easily accessible to all and serve those who do not wish to engage with salespeople at banks. "We want to set free the peer-to-peer power of traders around the globe," they said in a joint statement.

The new TradingFloor.com is designed for serious private investors trading with their own money, but it can also be used by those wishing simply to follow financial markets. The social trading platform features a range of content for traders, such as market news and views, data, insights and trade ideas from Saxo Bank's research teams and VIP authors. A real-time trade stream reveals the current market sentiment.

SaxoTraderGo and OpenAPI

In May 2015, Saxo Bank launched a new multi-asset trading platform called SaxoTraderGo. According to the bank, the platform was launched as an answer to clients’ increasing demand for mobile trading and easy transition between devices. According to trading and investment industry media, the platform is based on HTML5 and “offers an intuitive and fast multi-asset trading experience”.

In September 2015, Saxo Bank announced that it would open access to its trading infrastructure with the launch of OpenAPI, allowing partners, clients and external developers to access the bank's trading infrastructure and enable them to customise their trading experience 

According to news reports this means that external developers and white label clients are able to integrate all of the back-end and front-end functionality of Saxo Bank's trading platform offering: “Every company will be able to tweak the platform to a level where users will not be able to recognize whether they are using a white label of Saxo Bank’s.”

SaxoSelect
In the beginning of 2016, Saxo Bank launched SaxoSelect, a new digital investment service. One part of the environment is a range of portfolios built with iShares ETFs, launched in cooperation with BlackRock aimed for long-term investors and managed according to BlackRock's research. Saxo Bank also launched a copy trading service called Trading Strategies, offering access to a set of trading strategies managed and designed by a wide range of investors selected by Saxo Bank.

Controversy following Swiss franc cap removal
On 15 January 2015, the Swiss National Bank put an end to franc's cap against the euro, resulting in EUR/CHF rate going significantly below 1.20 level. On the following day, Saxo Bank announced that it would change the filling price of the orders executed on CHF currency pairs during low liquidity periods that followed the SNB announcement. This resulted in additional losses for some clients who were shorting EUR/CHF and other CHF instruments and had previously exited their trades during those low liquidity periods. Saxo Bank's action of amending deals forcing larger negative balances of clients resulted in complaints.

On 23 January 2015, Saxo Bank reported that due mainly to negative client balances on which it may not be able to collect, the bank might be forced to take a loss of up to DKK 700 million (about US$107 million).

On 29 January 2015, the Danish FSA said in a statement that it was in close dialogue with Saxo Bank and would require the bank to provide a detailed report of the actions taken during and after the incident.

In February 2015, a group of over 20 Saxo Bank clients, consisting of both Danish and foreign members, asked Danish law firm Andersen Partners to look at whether they could launch a class action lawsuit against the firm to recover losses made after the sudden removal of the CHF cap.

In July 2015, the Danish FSA issued its review of Saxo Bank's handling of the Swiss event, issuing two reprimands for having “failed to provide information about limitations for when the so-called "dedicated liquidity” applies” and "for not immediately providing information about significant difficulties in executing client orders to clients."

But regarding execution of stop loss orders and adjustment of transaction prices the FSA concludes:“The Danish FSA has found no reason to determine that Saxo Bank has therefore acted in conflict with the regulations on best execution. Furthermore, it is the assessment of the Danish FSA that the method presented and applied by Saxo Bank to set the adjusted settlement prices for the clients affected contributes to equality of treatment between clients and is not biased towards the interests of the Bank. Therefore, the Danish FSA finds that the method is not in conflict with the regulations that a securities dealer must act honestly and professionally.”Saxo Bank commented: “We take notice that the FSA after a thorough investigation has stated that Saxo Bank’s handling of the events and the application of price adjustments has been consistent with the regulations on investor protection and that the Bank’s terms are not in conflict with the regulations that a financial intermediary must act honestly and professionally towards its clients.”

In December 2016, the Danish Maritime and Commercial High Court ruled in Saxo's favor in a case filed by a Danish corporate client that lost money in when the Swiss national bank removed the peg, also underlining that Saxo's actions were in line with the bank's business terms and that market conditions were exceptional, that market was illiquid and that it, in practice, was impossible to execute orders at the initial prices.

Also in December 2016, the Danish Complaint Board of Banking Services concluded in Saxo's favor in case brought up by a private client. The Board concluded that Saxo has acted in a way that was fair and correct, and in accordance with the bank's general terms of business. And further concluding that the corrected prices contributed to reach “the, under the circumstances, best results” for clients.

In March 2017, the UK Financial Ombudsman Service ruled against Saxo Bank in the dispute with the client more than 2 years after the SNB event, stating that the trader has to be compensated by Saxo Bank.

Takeover by Geely
On 2 October 2017, it was announced that Chinese carmaker Geely is going to increase its stake in Saxo Bank to 51.5% if the deal is approved by regulators. Sampo Group will acquire a 19.9% stake, while Kim Fournais, Saxo Bank's CEO, will retain his 25.7% stake. Those selling shares are Sinar Mas and TPG.

Corporate headquarters and architecture

Saxo Bank is headquartered in Tuborg Havn in the northern outskirts of Copenhagen. The building, which received an RIBA International Award, was designed by Danish architects 3XN. The façade of the building is covered in diagonal white aluminium and blue glass patterns. In June 2010, Danish business newspaper, Borsen, named the Saxo headquarters the "Kingdom's finest domicile."

Other Saxo Bank offices are located in Australia, China, the Czech Republic, Dubai, France, Hong Kong, India, Italy, Japan, Netherlands, Singapore, Switzerland, Turkey and the United Kingdom.

Public relations
In 2008, Saxo Bank admitted editing its own Wikipedia entry through an anonymous user to remove information it said was untrue. When confronted by the media it acknowledged that a "slightly more elegant solution" should have been found.

Sponsorships
In mid-June 2008, Riis Cycling A/S announced that Saxo Bank had entered a three-year contract as title sponsor, with immediate effect, so the team entered the 2008 Tour de France as Team CSC Saxo Bank. Carlos Sastre won the Tour, and the team took the team classification. In 2009 and 2010, Andy Schleck finished the Tour in second place. When the bank signed the sponsorship agreement with Riis Cycling A/S, it noted that the team "has the international reach and name recognition that means we will be able to get our message our to most of our client groups around the globe. We love the sport, and believe that together we will be winners." It surprised everyone Lars Seier Christensen together with Bjarne Riis announced to the public on 3 August 2010 that Saxo Bank had extended its sponsorship of Riis Cycling for another year, and that Tour winner Alberto Contador had signed onto the team, with the aim of winning all Grand Tours (the Tour de France, the Giro d'Italia and the Vuelta a España) in one year. In 2013, Tinkoff Bank joined Saxo Bank as title sponsor. Following Bjarne Riis' sale of the team to Oleg Tinkov, Saxo Bank stopped its sponsorship as of 2016.

In January 2014, Saxo Bank announced it would be one the Lotus F1 team's sponsors this season, moving into motor racing. Saxo Bank told that it would use the Lotus team name in its marketing and also be able to host clients at Formula One races as a sponsor.

Saxo Bank has also sponsored reprints and distributed several books; including Ayn Rand's novel Atlas Shrugged, which the bank retranslated into Danish and distributed 10,000 copies (each new employee of the bank receives a copy). In May 2007, Saxo Bank donated one million DKK to the libertarian political party Ny Alliance (later renamed to the Liberal Alliance), co-CEO Lars Christensen later joined the party himself. Saxo Bank supported Liberal Alliance financially for several years, but stopped the contribution af the parliamentary election in 2015.

Allegations of misconduct and subsequent acquittal
While the first half of 2010 had been months of tremendous growth for Saxo Bank, allegations from former employees and two former clients sparked a two-month media focus on the bank. Saxo Bank was later cleared of all allegations and Danish Berlingske Tidende characterised Saxo Bank's media crisis as a bitter clash between the founders and former employees as well as former clients most likely due to personal disappointments or economic matters.

In April 2010, a Portuguese financial institution accused Saxo Bank of manipulating stock and currency prices, claiming it lost 10 million euros.

In May, a Lebanese investor said his company had lost DKK 20 million in four months because of unstable pricing and error interruptions on the SaxoTrader. Saxo Bank rejected that errors are a common thing and claimed that the SaxoTrader has an uptime of 100%

J. Korsoe Jensen, Attorney at Law for Saxo, issued lawsuits against the two former clients in June 2010, for false accusations.

The new Chairman of the Board of Saxo Bank, Kurt Larsen, admitted to Berlingske Tidende that the lawsuits filed against the two former clients were indeed very unusual measures. However, he also said:

Completion of FSA review and independent investigation
In July 2010, the Danish FSA completed their investigation of Saxo Bank, having analysed its trading platform and protection of investors. The Danish FSA found its automated trading system sufficiently transparent to users. Furthermore, the FSA found no remarks vis-à-vis the bank's service regarding of trading tips on the platform, the technical structure of the system or its robustness. Likewise, the Danish FSA concluded that the evaluation version of Saxo Bank's trader would permit possible clients to experience dealing with trading complex products without risk before they became customers for real.

However, the Danish FSA ordered an independent investigation of whether trades executed manually and performed on the Bank's electronic trading system are generally being executed in accordance with the Bank's common trading conditions and Best Execution Policy. In late August, it was announced by the Danish FSA that the investigation would be done by Oliver Wyman, the international consulting company.

The independent investigation is said to have cost Saxo Bank millions and were two months overdue when on 29 November 2010, the Danish FSA published a statement, saying that Oliver Wyman had concluded that "Saxo Bank was not systematically mispricing its manual order flow to the detriment of its clients or in violation of its General Business Terms and its Best Execution Policy" and "that it could find no evidence of clients being systematically unfairly treated at the individual level". Based on the above-mentioned conclusions, the Danish FSA found that the investigation by Oliver Wyman did not give cause for pursuing anything further regarding Saxo Bank's execution of manually executed trading orders nor regarding Saxo Bank's trading system. The statement also said that the instruments represented in the cases covered by the Danish media, this summer, and the client complaints received by the Danish FSA had been taken into account.

Criticism of the Danish FSA
Following the announcement of the Danish FSA on 8 July, Lars Bo Langsted, a professor of economic law at Aalborg University stated that:

The WeeklyFix column suggested that the Danish FSA had been pressured to act on Saxo by press reports. "There is no doubt the Danish FSA has felt under pressure to act (...) This begs the question, since when did financial authorities spring into action on the back of media speculation?"

References

External links

Banks of Denmark
Financial derivative trading companies
Foreign exchange companies
Financial services companies based in Copenhagen
Companies based in Gentofte Municipality
Financial services companies established in 1992
Banks established in 1992
Danish companies established in 1992
Online brokerages
2017 mergers and acquisitions